The BYU College of Physical and Mathematical Sciences was first organized in 1949 the College of Physical and Engineering Sciences.  Engineering was later separated off and merged with the College of Industrial and Technical Education to form the College of Engineering and Technology. The founding dean of the newly formed College of Physical and Mathematical Science in 1972 was Jae R. Ballif.

The BYU College of Physical and Mathematical Sciences consists of seven departments.

Chemistry and Biochemistry
Computer Science
Geological Science
Mathematics
Mathematics Education
Physics and Astronomy
Statistics

The department of physics and astronomy offers a broad array of classes in both these subjects.  It operates the BYU planetarium and the various telescopes connected with BYU's observatory.  Besides astronomy the department has research groups in Acoustics; Atomic, Molecular and Optical studies; Condensed Matter; Plasma; and Theoretical and Mathematical physics.  The program also works closely with the David O. McKay College of Education to train physics teachers primarily to teach in high schools. The College also supervises the BYU Center for Animation.

BYU Photo Studio
The BYU Photo Studio began as part of the Physics Department.  This was largely because it was founded by Wayne B. Hales who was a physics professor and had begun photography instruction at BYU.  It originally primarily served the needs of the Banyan, BYU's Yearbook.  From 1969-1985 the Photo Studio was directed by George Lee Hampton II.

References

External links
BYU College of Physical and Mathematical Sciences

College of Physical and Mathematical Sciences
Educational institutions established in 1949
University subdivisions in Utah
1949 establishments in Utah